Courier Rangers, known prior to 1968 as Otahuhu Rangers, is a former New Zealand football club based in the suburb of Otahuhu, Auckland. The team was a member of the New Zealand National Soccer League in 1978 and 1979, finishing fifth on their first season but being relegated after finishing 11th out of 12 teams in the second. Their best performance in the Chatham Cup came in 1977, when they reached the quarter-finals, where they lost to eventual champions Nelson United

The team disbanded in 1982. Current team Otahuhu United was formed as a breakaway from Rangers in 1975.

External links
Ultimatenzsoccer website Courier Rangers page

Defunct association football clubs in New Zealand
Association football clubs in Auckland
1959 establishments in New Zealand
1982 disestablishments in New Zealand